Harold Black  (1913–1993) was an American artist known for his work with the Works Progress Administration (WPA). Born on December 13, 1913, in New York City he attended National Academy of Design. He was married to fellow artist Isabel Bate (1909–1995). The couple lived in New York City. They were commissioned by the WPA to complete eight murals for the U.S. Post Office in Salina, Kansas. The couple completed the murals and sent them to Salina, but they were never installed. The couple also illustrated the 1941 book The Kaw: The Heart of a Nation by Floyd Benjamin Streeter. Black's work was included in the 1940 Museum of Modern Art exhibition and competition The Artist as Reporter.

Black died on January 23, 1993, in Mexico City, Mexico. His work is in the collection of the Smithsonian American Art Museum.

References

External links
 images of Black's work on ArtNet

1913 births
1993 deaths
Muralists
Artists from New York City
Federal Art Project artists